{{Infobox film
| name     = Samundar
| image    = Samundar movie poster.jpg
| caption  =
| writer   = Nadira Babbar(Dialogues)H. M. Mirza(Story & Screenplay) 
| starring = Sunny DeolPoonam DhillonAnupam KherAmrish Puri
| director = Rahul Rawail
| producer = Mushir-Riaz
| music    = R. D. Burman
| cinematography = Baba Azmi 
| editing  = Om Prakash Makkar
| released = 
| language = Hindi
| country  = India 
}}Samundar''' is an Indian romantic action film directed by Rahul Rawail and produced by Mushir-Riaz released in 1986. The movie stars Sunny Deol, Poonam Dhillon, Anupam Kher and Amrish Puri.

Cast
 Sunny Deol as Ajit
 Poonam Dhillon as Anjali
 Anupam Kher as Rajeshwar Nath / Girija Shankar
 Paresh Rawal as Hansukh
 Amrish Puri as Raizada Narsingh
 Navin Nischol as Surajbhan
 Manauj Nair as Samundar

Soundtrack
Lyrics: Anand Bakshi

Among the songs, the duet "Ae Sagar Ki Lehron, Hum Bhi Aate Hain Theharo", sung by Lata Mangeshkar and Kishore Kumar, remains very popular. Another song, "Ye Kori Karaari Kanwaari Nazar", was also sung very well by Kishore Kumar.

References

External links
 

1986 films
1980s Hindi-language films
Indian crime drama films
Films scored by R. D. Burman
Films directed by Rahul Rawail
1986 crime drama films
Films set in the Maldives
Films shot in the Maldives